The following is a list of symbols of Bohol province, Philippines.

Provincial symbols

References

External links
The Bohol Hymn
Bohol Provincial Symbols
The Bohol Provincial flag and seal

Symbols
Bohol